The Salaheddin Islamic Centre is a mosque located in the Scarborough district of the city of Toronto, Ontario, Canada noted for its outspoken Imam Aly Hindy.

Since Aly Hindy took over the leadership of the Centre in 1997, Salaheddin has transformed from a small mosque to become a full centre with so many facilities and programs. Beside offering regular prayers, lectures & Conferences, Salaheddin Centre is assisting the disadvantaged and the destitute by offering a host of services including full-time elementary and High school, Marriage and counselling services, food bank, Youth programs; and funeral service along with other activities that seek to improve people's lives.

One of its key founders was Hassan Farhat, but he was made persona non grata by the mosque's administrators and forbidden from continuing to hold any position in the facility; although he was allowed to return for worship. A number of its worshippers have been accused of ties to terrorism, including Ahmed Khadr who ran a charity named Health and Education Project International that used to attend the mosque and allegedly funneled money to Afghan training camps.

Brothers Saeed and Masoud Rasoul, whose father was a prayer leader at the mosque, later went missing in Iraq, believed to have fought for Ansar al-Islam, possibly at the urging of Farhat.

Following the 2006 Ontario terrorism plot, it emerged that Fahim Ahmad and a number of other suspects were members of the mosque.

During the bail Hearing of Abdullah Khadr in August 2008, the Crown attacked the credibility of the mosque — although judge Trotter dismissed the suggestion, referring to testimony from RCMP officer Tarek Mokdad who agreed it was not reasonable to suggest the mosque supported terrorism.

See also

List of mosques in Canada 
List of mosques in the Americas
Lists of mosques

References

External links

Mosques in Toronto
Islamic organizations based in Canada
Organizations based in Toronto
Buildings and structures in Scarborough, Toronto